Shipyard Brewing Company is a brewery and soft drink manufacturer in Portland, Maine, USA, and founded in 1994. Shipyard is the largest brewer in Maine (owning the Shipyard, Sea Dog Brewing Company, and Casco Bay Brewing Company banners, and bottling under contract with Gritty McDuff's Brewing Company). Shipyard is the fourth largest microbrewery in New England after Boston Beer Company, Harpoon Brewery, and Magic Hat Brewing Company.

History
Shipyard first began in 1992 as the Kennebunkport Brewing Co. with founders Fred Forsley and Alan Pugsley at Federal Jack’s Restaurant and Brew Pub in Kennebunk, which is one of Maine's original brew pubs and working breweries.  Within two years, demand for Kennebunkport Brewing Co. beer outpaced the small operation and, in April 1994, businessman Fred Forsley and brewer Alan Pugsley expanded and opened the Shipyard Brewing Company in the heart of the waterfront in Portland, Maine on the site of the former Crosby Laughlin Foundry.

In 2008, Shipyard Brewing Company brewed 81,641 barrels of ale and shipped 2,900 barrels of soda. Its products are available in 40 states.

Shipyard operates several restaurants and contract breweries, and is active in many community projects around New England. Shipyard is partners with the Sea Dog Brewing Company and Casco Bay Brewing Company. Shipyard also produces beer under contract for Gritty McDuff's Brewing Company, brews an American version of Old Thumper under license from Ringwood Brewery, and distributes the Capt'n Eli's Soda line of soft drinks.

Shipyard previously brewed at the Shipyard Emporium in Winter Park, Florida.

Casco Bay Brewing Co.
Casco Bay Brewing Co. was a brewery in Portland, Maine, U.S. In 2008, Casco Bay was acquired by Shipyard Brewing Company and became a Shipyard brand. The brewery was founded by Bob Wade and Mike (pud) Lacharite in 1994. Today Casco Bay distributes beer throughout New England under its own brand as well as the Carrabassett brand. The brewery had a capacity of 11,000 bbls a year. As of 2008, Casco Bay has been acquired by Shipyard Brewing Company and is now brewed and bottled in their facility near the Portland waterfront.

Casco Bay uses two-row malted barley and a variety of other specialty malts. The brewery also utilizes grains from Germany, England, Belgium, Canada and the United States to adjust the flavor, color and mouthfeel of its brews. It imports hops from Germany for its Pilsner and utilizes hops from the Pacific Northwest of the United States for the rest of its brews. The ale yeast is an American strain, while lager yeast is imported from Germany.

See also

List of Maine breweries
Beer in the United States

References

External links

Beer brewing companies based in Maine
Companies based in Portland, Maine
1992 establishments in Maine
American companies established in 1992